Cobalt Blue is an Indian Hindi-language drama film written and directed by Sachin Kundalkar starring Prateik Babbar, Dr.Neelay Mehendale and Anjali Sivaraman. It is adapted from the novel of the same name which follows a story of a brother and sister who fall in love with the same man; ensuing events shatter a traditional Marathi family. The film was slated to release on Netflix on 3 December 2021 but was postponed and released on 2 April 2022.

Plot 

When an aspiring author and his free-spirited sister both fall for the enigmatic paying guest at their home, ensuing events rock their traditional family. It's a movie that depicts the loneliness and fear around same-sex love.

Cast
 Prateik Babbar as unnamed paying guest
 Dr. Neelay Mehendale as Tanay Vidhyadhar Dixit
 Anant V Joshi as Aseem Dixit
 Anjali Sivaraman as Anuja Dixit
 Poornima Indrajith as Sister Mary
 Neil Bhoopalam as Literature teacher
 Geetanjali Kulkarni as Sharda Dixit
 Shishir Sharma as Mr. Dixit

Release
In November 2018, it was announced that the Cobalt Blue novel would be adapted into a feature film for Netflix. It has been written and directed by Kundalkar and was scheduled for streaming on the platform starting December 3, 2021 but it was then postponed.Later, It was released on 2 April 2022.

Reception

Critic Response
Nandini Ramnath from Scroll.in gave a positive review to the film writing, "Neelay Mehendale's delicate characterisation of Tanay and Prateik Babbar's overt hunkiness create the film's most memorable moments, which have the vividness of primary colours and the erotic flush of first love." Deccan Herald  gave the film 3/5 stars and wrote,"The movie has heartwarming Hindi poetry catering to various shades of emotions. The entire movie is a slow, lyrical and heartbreaking journey blended with literature, poetry, music and art. Primary hues have been effectively used to bring out emotions.

References

External links
 
 

Hindi-language Netflix original films
2022 films
2022 drama films
Indian drama films
2020s Hindi-language films
Films directed by Sachin Kundalkar
Indian LGBT-related films